The Hollow Crown is an anthology, devised by John Barton in 1961, which presents in dramatic form speeches, documents, gossip and music, associated with the British monarchy from William the Conqueror to Queen Victoria. A videotape of a broadcast can be seen at The Paley Center for Media in New York City.

The work has also been produced for the stage several times. According to Ian Richardson "every member of the Royal Shakespeare Company - present, past, or passed-on - has participated in it at one time or another".

Productions 
Among the earliest fund raisers for the reopened Georgian Angles Theatre in Wisbech was The Hollow Crown, which launched Jill Freud’s successful company.

In 2002, Richardson joined Sir Derek Jacobi, Sir Donald Sinden, and Dame Diana Rigg in an international tour visiting Wellington, New Zealand and Sydney, Melbourne and Perth, Australia, returning to the Royal Shakespeare Theatre, Stratford-upon-Avon. A Canadian tour in 2004 substituted Alan Howard for Jacobi and Vanessa Redgrave for Rigg.

References

1961 plays
British plays
Literature about literature